Khwezilokusa Mkhafu is a South African rugby union player for the Griffons (rugby union) in the Currie Cup and in the Rugby Challenge. His regular position is hooker or prop.

Career

In 2013, Mkhafu joined the  training group prior to the 2013 Super Rugby season, but was later released to the Bulldogs' 2013 Vodacom Cup squad.

In 2013, he was included in a South Africa President's XV team that played in the 2013 IRB Tbilisi Cup and won the tournament after winning all three matches.

References

South African rugby union players
Living people
1988 births
Border Bulldogs players
Rugby union hookers
Boland Cavaliers players
Griffons (rugby union) players
Griquas (rugby union) players
Rugby union players from the Eastern Cape